Mungindi  is a town and locality on the border of New South Wales (NSW) and Queensland, Australia. The town is within Moree Plains Shire in New South Wales. Within Queensland, the locality is split between the Shire of Balonne (the western part) and the Goondiwindi Region (eastern part) with the town in the Shire of Balonne. It possesses a New South Wales postcode. Mungindi sits on the Carnarvon Highway and straddles the Barwon River which is the border between New South Wales and Queensland.

Geography
Mungindi means water hole in the river in Kamilaroi. Located uniquely on both sides of the New South Wales and Queensland border, Mungindi is the only border town in the Southern Hemisphere with the same name on both sides of the border. The state border runs down the centre of the Barwon River and under the centre of the Mungindi Bridge, but there is no exact marker on the bridge to indicate the point.

Nearby towns are Moree in New South Wales and St George in Queensland.  Nearby villages are, in New South Wales, Weemelah, Garah, Ashley and Boomi, and in Queensland, the towns of Thallon, Dirranbandi and Hebel. A section of the Carnarvon Highway via Mungindi makes up part of the shortest route from Sydney to Darwin. There is an airport close to the town.

History
Mungindi and the surrounding areas were originally inhabited by Aborigines of the Kamilaroi (Gamilaraay) tribe. Their tribal grounds extended from the Barwon River to south of the Namoi River near Gunnedah. Gamilaraay (Gamilaroi, Kamilaroi, Comilroy) is a language from South-West Queensland and North-West New South Wales. The Gamilaraay language region includes the landscape within the local government boundaries of the Balonne Shire Council, including the towns of Dirranbandi, Thallon, Talwood and Bungunya as well as the border towns of Mungindi and Boomi extending to Moree, Tamworth and Coonabarabran in NSW.

Yuwaalaraay (also known as Yuwalyai, Euahlayi, Yuwaaliyaay, Gamilaraay, Kamilaroi, Yuwaaliyaayi) is an Australian Aboriginal language spoken on Yuwaalaraay country. The Yuwaalaraay language region includes the landscape within the local government boundaries of the Shire of Balonne, including the town of Dirranbandi as well as the border town of Hebel extending to Walgett and Collarenebri in New South Wales.

Major Thomas Mitchell passed through Mungindi on his exploration of the interior in search of new areas suitable for agricultural development during the 1830s.

By the 1850s, with stock moving on both sides of the Barwon River, the ford at Mungindi just upstream from the present bridge became the principal crossing. Reliable waterholes and shaded flats on the riverbanks provided early drovers with a pleasant camp in the area, which the Gamilaroi Aboriginal People had held since antiquity as an important meeting place. Regular use of the track is indicated by the fact that two,  stock routes were proclaimed by 1868, both to Mungindi, one from St George and one from Whyenbah via Dareel.

The movement of drovers and the coming of settlers soon attracted others to provide them with goods and services. The first known of these services was a hotel, or inn. Built in 1863 by Alexander Grant Walker, it was located on the south bank of the river. Alexander was certainly moved by the pioneering spirit. After coming to New South Wales from Scotland at the age of twenty-one, he married at Murrurundi and brought his bride to Moree where they were among the first to purchase land in the town area. They built a hotel in Frome Street but within twelve months transferred the licence to Alexander's Mungindi Inn, also known as Walker's Hotel and in later years, The Green Hut. He built himself a cottage and also stables for the use of hotel patrons. These buildings were along the bank of the Barwon between present day North-Western Motors and Quinn's Motors, near the crossing which was then east of Garden Island. It was then that Alexander applied for  along the river.

Queensland became a separate colony in 1859 and by 1862 the Queensland Government was operating a packhorse mail service between Surat and Yarawa. A private mail service had for some years run from Yarawa to Moree. This was later extended to Mungindi town. By 1865, the volume of mail prompted the Postmaster-General of Queensland to send an inspector who recommended Alexander Walker's appointment as postmaster.

A year or so later it seems the new postmaster had begun to experience the frustrations common to border-town officials. As Mungindi, Queensland's postmaster he was not empowered to deal with letters bearing NSW stamps so he applied for, and was appointed to the position of postmaster of Mungindi, NSW in 1867. The following year there were 43 subscribers listed in the Post Office Directory for Mungindi, Qld. Very few of these were family men but the numbers explain the need for the store, which Alexander was operating at that time.

In 1876 an agency of the Government Savings Bank of NSW opened through his Post Office in NSW. When work began in the same year on the first bridge over the Barwon River, Alexander realised the advantage of having his store located near the new crossing. His shop, built that year, was close to the site of the present Old Police Station and at the time, near the Customs House, which operated until Federation in 1900 ended trading between colonies/ states.

Alexander Walker, who might be called the 'Founder of Mungindi', died suddenly in 1878. His wife and family continued to run the Post Office, store and hotel. Apparently Mrs Walker became well known as the 'Queen of Mungindi'. Stories say that it was common to see over 100 horses tied up outside the hotel. If a 'blue' started she would let down the slip rails and take to the horses with a broom. By the time the horses were rounded up the reason for the fight would have been forgotten and everyone was happy again. Presumably Mrs. Walker was no longer compelled to keep law and order in this unique way after the first NSW constable was stationed in 1882.

During the 1880s movement in the area had led to the development of regular stagecoach services and communications further improved with the opening of a telegraphic office in 1881. It would seem that families quickly followed the young men who found work opening up the area for the township on the Queensland side was surveyed probably in 1885 and the blocks offered for sale. An area was reserved for a cemetery, behind the present hospital, but as far as is known, only two people were buried there.

A survey to designate camping and watering reserves had been carried out on the NSW side in 1877 and the reserves 'gazetted' in 1884. However, on 27 February 1886 those reserves were revoked, as on that day
"His Excellency the Governor, with the advice of the Executive Council … directed it to be notified … that portions of Crown Lands are declared to be set apart as sites for the village of Mungindi and of suburban lands attached thereto."

The surveys of allotments were made after this proclamation and on 24 January 1888 in Moree, the first Mungindi town blocks were offered at auction sales they sold for amounts varying from £11 10s to £46. Those earliest sales were for blocks between North, Kunopia, Wirrah and Yarouah Streets. In 1890, to satisfy a change in parliamentary acts Mungindi was again proclaimed a village.

The township of Mungindi developed rapidly after that proclamation. Though 1890 brought a devastating flood which forced many families into difficulties and may have been responsible for the widespread of prickly pear which caused further hardship, many new names appear in Mungindi as selectors took up small blocks offered from land resumed after changes to land tenure in 1884 and as more tradesmen and businessmen took up residence in the town.

In 1891 the citizens of Mungindi, Queensland, petitioned their government for a policeman.

By 1894, when the NSW school was twelve months old and had become a full public school with an average minimum attendance of 30, the Queensland Government opened Mungindi Provisional School opened with an enrolment of 22 students. On 1 January 1909, the Queensland school became Mungindi State School. The Queensland school closed in 1968. The Queensland school was at 92-100 Barwon Street.

At the start of the 1900s, Mungindi had its own newspaper, a hospital, a doctor, a solicitor, two schools, two post offices, a brewery, at least four hotels, two police stations (one in each state), with three men stationed at each, two race clubs, a P.& A. Society, two butchers, two hairdressers, two dressmakers and milliners, a shoemaker, a saddler, a baker, a tailor, a saw mill, a pawnbroker, a teacher of pianoforte, violin and oil painting, about four contract carpenters, a housepainter and decorator, a bricklayer and a tinsmith. Its approximately 250 residents enjoyed many shared entertainments. Balls and dances, fairs and shows, concerts and travelling tent shows, and fortnightly meetings of the Literary and Debating Society. In the 'Sportsman’s Paradise',fishing, bicycling, horse racing, cricket, billiards and tennis were keenly pursued.

The line opened on 7 December 1914 and was closed between Weemelah and Mungindi  on 5 January 1974 when services were withdrawn following flooding. The former railway station is now used as a private residence.

During 2020 and 2021, the Queensland borders were closed to most people due to the COVID-19 pandemic. Border crossing points were either closed or had a Queensland Police checkpoint to allow entry to only those people with an appropriate permit. The Carnarvon Highway at Mungindi had a police checkpoint.

On 1 September 2020, a fire destroyed many shops on St George St including the grocery store and butcher.

Heritage listings 
Mungindi has the following heritage-listed sites:
 at the Barwon River, Queensland: Cameron's 1 Ton Survey Post

Amenities
There is currently a supermarket, hairdresser, real-estate agent, pharmacy, clothing store, butchery, bakery, hardware and agricultural store on Mungindi's main street: St George Street. There is a petrol station at the end of St George Street on the NSW approach into town from Moree. There is a hospital, a library and a range of sporting activities.

There is a Catholic primary school and a public school from kindergarten through high school.

The newly refurbished Two Mile Hotel which was rebuilt following a fire is a two-mile drive out of town on the Queensland side heading towards St George.

Mungindi has two times zones during daylight-saving-time. The town has a pre-school in Queensland and the other educational facilities are in NSW. The hospital is on the northern side of the river and the two hotels are on each side of the river. The district is now a hub for regional cotton, beef cattle, and wheat industries.

Attractions
The One Ton Post was erected by surveyor John Brewer Cameron in 1881 to celebrate the completion of two long and hard years of surveys.

Many items of interest are on display at the local History Park on the outskirts of Mungindi.

In popular culture 
The author Scott Monk featured Mungindi in his novel Raw, which features a character called Brett who was sent to an institution farm.

Transport

References

Further reading

External links

 
 Town map of Mungindi in Queensland, 1977

 
Towns in New South Wales
Towns in Queensland
Borders of New South Wales
Borders of Queensland
North West Slopes
Shire of Balonne
Goondiwindi Region
Localities in Queensland